Kane County is the name of two counties in the United States:

 Kane County, Illinois 
 Kane County Cougars, a minor league baseball team based in Kane County, Illinois
 Kane County, Utah

See also